The 110th Massachusetts General Court, consisting of the Massachusetts Senate and the Massachusetts House of Representatives, met in 1889 during the governorship of Oliver Ames. Harris C. Hartwell served as president of the Senate and William Emerson Barrett served as speaker of the House.

When in session at the state house in Boston, a few of the legislators stayed overnight in Adams House, the American House, Hotel Brunswick, Norfolk House, Quincy House, Richwood House, or the United States Hotel.

Senators

Representatives

See also
 51st United States Congress
 List of Massachusetts General Courts

References

Further reading

External links
 
 

Political history of Massachusetts
Massachusetts legislative sessions
massachusetts
1889 in Massachusetts